Ronni Kern is an American film and television writer and producer. Kern is best known for writing such films as American Pop and A Change of Seasons, as well as miniseries and television movies such as Helen of Troy, Homeless to Harvard (for which she won the Christopher Award) and Jesse Stone: Sea Change.. She has also written three novels, Wandering Boy in 2013, Uncharted in 2018  and Duck! in 2018. Her novella The Key will be published by Storylandia on March 1, 2021.

Selected filmography 

 Jesse Stone: Thin Ice (2009) (TV movie)
 Jesse Stone: Sea Change (2007) (TV movie)
 Blue Smoke (2007) (TV movie)
 Homeless to Harvard: The Liz Murray Story (2003) (TV movie)
 The Princess and the Marine (2001) (TV movie)
 Deep in My Heart (1999) (TV movie)
 Point Last Seen (1998) (TV movie)
 In My Sister's Shadow (1997) (TV movie)
 Solomon & Sheba (1995) (TV movie)
 Guinevere (1994) (TV movie)
 American Pop (1981)
 A Change of Seasons (1980)

References

External links

American screenwriters
American television writers
American television producers
American film producers
Living people
Year of birth missing (living people)